is a common masculine Japanese given name. It can be written in many ways. In the following lists, the kanji in parentheses are the individual's way of writing the name Hiroki.

Possible writings
Hiroki can be written using different kanji characters and can mean:

弘樹, "vast tree, great tree, generous tree, great establish"
宏樹, "wide tree, large tree, wide establish"
博紀, "fair chronicle"
浩紀, "vigorous, chronicle"
博希, "ample hope"
大樹, "great tree"

People with the name
, Japanese footballer
Hiroki Aiba (弘樹; born 1987), Japanese actor, dancer, and singer
, Japanese music artist and composer
, Japanese martial artist and kickboxer
, Japanese footballer 
, Japanese footballer 
, Japanese football
, Japanese sumo wrestler 
Hiroki Azuma (浩紀; born 1971), Japanese cultural critic
, Japanese footballer
, Japanese football player
Hiroki Endo (浩輝), Japanese manga artist
, Japanese actor
, Japanese footballer
, head coach of the Sendai 89ers
, Japanese sprinter
, Japanese voice actor
, Japanese stage, film, and television actor
, Japanese baseball player
, Japanese animator
Hiroki Hokama (弘樹; born 1983), Japanese singer from the rock band Orange Range
, Japanese fencer
, Japanese actor
Hiroki Iikura (大樹; born 1986), Japanese professional footballer 
, Japanese footballer
, Japanese shogi player
, Japanese actor
, Japanese boxer
, Japanese lightweight kickboxer
Hiroki Ito (disambiguation), multiple people
, Japanese football player and manager
, Japanese football player 
, Japanese triathlete and open water swimmer
, Japanese speed skater
, Japanese sumo wrestler 
, Japanese character designer, anime artist
, Japanese kickboxer
, Japanese footballer
Hiroki Kikuta (裕樹; born 1962), Japanese video game composer and designer
Hiroki Kishida (岸田 裕樹; born 1981), Japanese football player
, Japanese footballer
Hiroki Kobayashi (footballer, born 1992), Japanese footballer
, Japanese baseball player
Hiroki Kondo (disambiguation), multiple people
, Japanese comedian and actor 
Hiroki Kosai (洋樹; born 1933), Japanese astronomer
Hiroki Kotani (born 1971), Japanese mixed martial artist
, Japanese footballer
, Japanese football
, Japanese mixed martial artist
, Japanese footballer
Hiroki Kuroda (博樹; born 1975), Japanese professional baseball player
, Japanese footballer
, Japanese singer
, Japanese long-distance runner
, Japanese football player
Hiroki Matsukata (弘樹; born 1942), Japanese actor
, Japanese footballer
, Japanese footballer
, Japanese footballer
, Japanese baseball player
, Japanese baseball player
, Japanese actor
, Japanese football player
, Japanese football player
, Japanese handball player
, Japanese archer
, American artist of impressionism 
, Japanese footballer
Hiroki Moriuchi (寛樹; born 1994), Japanese singer from the rock band MY FIRST STORY
, Japanese tennis player
, Japanese singer and actor
Hiroki Nakajima (中島 弘貴; born 1988),  Japanese welterweight kickboxer
Hiroki Nakata (宏樹; born 1964), Japanese shogi player
, Japanese professional baseball infielder
, Japanese football player
, Japanese actress, singer, voice actor
Hiroki Narabayashi ((奈良林寛紀; born 1988), Japanese football player
Hiroki Narimiya (寛貴; born 1982), Japanese actor
, Japanese cyclist
, Japanese footballer
, Japanese baseball pitcher
, Japanese pole vaulter
, Japanese football player 
, Japanese badminton player 
, Japanese footballer
, Japanese footballer
, Japanese footballer
, Japanese baseball player
, Japanese motorcycle racer
, Japanese race driver
, Japanese professor of biology
, Japanese former professional baseball pitcher
, Japanese professional ice hockey winger
, Japanese footballer
, Japanese baseball player 
, Japanese footballer
, Japanese pole vaulter
, Japanese paralympian athlete
, Japanese basketball player and executive
, Japanese football player and manager
, Japanese handball player
Hiroki Shimowada (born 1976), Japanese voice actor
, Japanese football player 
Hiroki Shishido (大樹; born 1977), Japanese welterweight shoot-boxer
, Japanese footballer
Hiroki Suzuki (disambiguation), multiple people
, Japanese judoka
Hiroki Takahashi (広樹; born 1974), Japanese voice actor
, Japanese footballer
, Japanese shogi player
, Japanese actor, narrator
, Japanese footballer
Hiroki Wada (弘樹), Japanese composer and arranger also known as H-Wonder
Hiroki Yasumoto (洋貴; born 1977), Japanese voice actor
Ryūichi Hiroki (廣木 隆一; born 1954), Japanese film director
Hiroki Uchi (博貴; born 1986), Japanese idol singer and actor
, Japanese footballer
, Japanese baseball player
, Japanese football player
, Japanese sprint canoeist
, Japanese sumo wrestler
, Japanese manga artist
Hiroki Yamada (disambiguation), multiple people
, Japanese long-distance runner
Hiroki Yamamoto (disambiguation), multiple people
Hiroki Yokoyama (disambiguation), multiple people
, Japanese race car driver
, Japanese rugby union player
, Japanese footballer

Fictional characters
Hiroki, also known as Buzz or Jake, a character in the Ape Escape series
Hiroki, the main character in the video game Trek to Yomi
Hiroki Awano, an antagonist in the video game Yakuza 0
Hiroki Ishiyama, a supporting character in Code Lyoko in which he is younger brother of fourteen-year-old Yumi, the loyal fan-wielding and telekinetic Lyoko Warrior
Hiroki Kamijo, a character in Junjo Romantica
Hiroki Senō, called Hiro, the protagonist and hero of the anime film Venus Wars
Hiroki Sugimura, a character in the Battle Royale novel and film
Hiroki Tanno, main character of Over My Dead Body manga series by Jessica Knewasser.
Hiroki Takasugi, a star baseball player in the anime Princess Nine

See also
Hirooki, a masculine Japanese given name

References

Japanese masculine given names